Vasundhara Das (born 18 August 1977) is an Indian singer, musician and actress.

Vasundhara's films include Hey Ram (Tamil/Hindi), Monsoon Wedding (English), Citizen (Tamil), Ravana Prabhu (Malayalam), Lankesh Patrike (Kannada) and several others.

She won the Filmfare Award for Best Female Playback Singer – Tamil for the film Mudhalvan

Personal life 
She was born into a Hebbar Iyengar family on 27 October 1977 in Bangalore, Karnataka to Kishen Das and Nirmala Das. She studied at Cluny Convent High School, Bangalore, Sri Vidya Mandir, Bangalore and Mount Carmel College, Bangalore, graduating in economics, Statistics and Mathematics.

She began training in Hindustani classical music at the age of six under her grandmother Indira Das, who ran a music school on the top of their house. She then joined the Lalit Kala Academy, and later studied under Pandit Parameshwar Hegde, her Guru. In her college days, she was a lead singer of a girl band and was soprano in the college choir. In an interview, she states that – "I got booed off the first time I sang on stage". She speaks Tamil, Kannada, Telugu, English, Malayalam, Hindi and Spanish.

In 2012, Vasundhara married her long-time friend, Roberto Narain, a drummer and percussionist.

Career

Acting 

In 1999, Vasundhara debuted as an actor with Kamal Haasan in the film Hey Ram though she started her career industry as a playback singer. She played the lead actress alongside Mohanlal in the Malayalam movie Raavanaprabhu (2001), with Ajith Kumar in the Tamil movie Citizen (2001) and with Darshan in the Kannada movie Lankesh Patrike. She also starred in Mira Nair's movie Monsoon Wedding (2001).

Music 
She worked with playback singing career with A. R. Rahman's Tamil film Mudhalvan, for which she sang the song "Shakalaka Baby", which won her the Filmfare Award for Best Female Playback Singer – Tamil 2001.
Later she worked with composers such as Vijaya Bhaskar, Yuvan Shankar Raja and G. V. Prakash Kumar.
Her first film as a music composer was Paranthe Wali Gali (2014) along with Vikram Khajuria.

She was a founding member of Arya, a world music band that performed in Europe and America, and broke up in 2004. She has composed music at her Bangalore-based studio, The Active. She has also been involved in several independent projects such as Channel V Jammin', BBC's HIV awareness anthem for India "Har Kadam", Mission Ustaad, Global Rhythms, Nylon Soundz, and The Shah Hussain Project, a collaborative album with Sufi singer Mir Mukhtiyar Ali.
She has a French single out in France called "L'ete Indien" in collaboration with Paris-based Agrumes Studio.

Vasundhara trained under the founder of drum jam, Arthur Hull in Hawaii.
In 2013, she initiated an event, Community Drumjam at the MG Road metro station, Bangalore. It has since been run monthly by the Rangoli Metro Art Center, and Drumjam, a Western music company she co-founded and is running with her husband.
They have conducted drum-jam programs at educational institutions and for communities of different age groups including children at risk, elderly with dementia and terminally-ill cancer patients.
In 2016, she conducted a drum jam session for the India national cricket team for their team building exercise initiative.

Filmography

Discography

References

External links 

1977 births
Living people
Actresses in Malayalam cinema
Indian women playback singers
Actresses from Bangalore
Actresses in Hindi cinema
Actresses in Tamil cinema
Actresses in Kannada cinema
Indian film actresses
Indian women pop singers
Indian women songwriters
Tamil playback singers
Kannada playback singers
Indian environmentalists
Businesspeople from Bangalore
Businesswomen from Karnataka
Singers from Bangalore
21st-century Indian singers
Indian women environmentalists
Activists from Karnataka
Filmfare Awards South winners
21st-century Indian women singers
Women musicians from Karnataka
Mount Carmel College, Bangalore alumni